Borovitskaya is a station of the Serpukhovsko-Timiryazevskaya Line of the Moscow Metro. It was opened in January 1986. It is geographically located in the very centre of Moscow, although it is mainly used as a transfer station.

Transfers
The station provides transfers to the Biblioteka Imeni Lenina station of the Sokolnicheskaya Line, and the Arbatskaya station of the Arbatsko-Pokrovskaya Line. It shares its ground vestibule and exit to Mokhovaya Street and Borovitskaya Square with the station Biblioteka Imeni Lenina. There is no direct transfer to the Aleksandrovsky Sad station which is a part of the same interchange point; it's accessible via each of the above two stations only.

Gallery

External links
Borovitskaya on metro.ru

Moscow Metro stations
Railway stations in Russia opened in 1986
Serpukhovsko-Timiryazevskaya Line
Railway stations located underground in Russia